Clonamery Church is a medieval church and National Monument in County Kilkenny, Ireland.

Location

History

St Broonahawn (pattern day 16 May) founded a monastery at Clonamery. The present church was built in the 9th or 10th century.

The Romanesque chancel was added in the 12th century, while the out-building (sacristy) be 15th/16th century, and a bell-cote was added at the same time.

Tradition states that the church continued in use until 1691, when Edward Fitzgerald of Cloone Castle died at the Battle of Aughrim.

Church

Clonamery is a nave-and-chancel church with a sacristy built of roughly dressed stones not laid in regular courses with a slight batter. There is a flat-headed west doorway with a cross pattée above the lintel and antae in the west gable. The bell-cote had room for two bells: a sanctus bell and a bell for calling the people to prayer.

A pillar-stone of early date was found at Clonamery. It is made of greenish slate and bears three crosses and two cup marks. There are some cross slabs and a grave slab also.

References

Churches in County Kilkenny
Archaeological sites in County Kilkenny
National Monuments in County Kilkenny
Former churches in the Republic of Ireland